Gururaj Ananda Yogi (birth name: Purushottam Narsinhram Valodia, 3 March 1932 in Gujarat, India – 17 May 1988 in Cape Town, South Africa) was the founder of International Foundation of Spiritual Unfoldment and Foundation for International Spiritual Unfoldment (FISU), another meditation society, is also based on his teachings. Gururaj Ananda Yogi started giving satsang in his living room at his home in South Africa and during 1974 with the help of some of his disciples in South Africa started The South African Meditation Society and The International Foundation for Spiritual Unfoldment. In October 1974 Marguerite Cusley (alias Gita) a teacher from Transcendental meditation of Maharishi Mahesh Yogi, organized for him a trip to the UK where Gururaj Ananda was introduced to many TM teachers from around the world and who soon joined his movement, The International Foundation for Spiritual Unfoldment (IFSU).

Within that organization several National Mediation Societies were created that are today continuing teaching meditation in different countries around the world. Among them: The British Meditation Society, The American Meditation Society, The Spanish Meditation Society, The Danish Meditation Society, The Irish Meditation Society, The Belgian Meditation Society, The Canadian Meditation Society and The Israeli Meditation Society. These societies and IFSU are the actual copyright holders of Gururaj's recorded teachings and are engaged in making a major publishing effort in association with publishers in both the US and Spain.

Gururaj Ananda Yogi was a philosopher, a mystic and a poet who taught in the time-honored methods of the oral tradition. His disciples recorded most of his talks, both public and informal. Some of those transcribed talks have been compiled into books Of particular relevance was the one published in Spain by Espasa Calpe that received very good critics in the general press. Antonio Gala in his articles in El País every Sunday used to find inspiration in the quotes from Gururaj Ananda Yogi.

During 2005–2006 BISC in University of California at Berkeley started a project to put all his recorded teachings online using fuzzy logic to do natural language search over them that had to be stopped due to lack of funds.

During his lifetime as a guru, Gururaj used to refer to the spiritual path as The Path of Unfoldment. After his death, two of his prime disciples, Rajesh Ananda, and Jasmini Ananda founded Foundation for International Spiritual Unfoldment, being the continuation of Gururaj's teachings, follows the Meditation for Spiritual Unfoldment school of thought that promotes Gururaj's teachings for The Path of Unfoldment. This and the fact that Rajesh Ananda and Jasmini Ananda  were prepared and initiated by Gururaj to be his successors, is debated by IFSU despite conclusive evidence and various recordings that confirm this.  However, over the last 22 years since Gururaj physical passing, the organisation headed by Rajesh Ananda and Jasmini Ananda has become the largest and most successful organisation in the world with 80 branches in 13 countries and they continue to grow at an accelerated pace having strong founded leadership and guruship by promoting Gururaj's teachings. FISU has become one of the world's largest and most active meditation schools and is continually expanding.

References

External links
 FISU - Foundation for International Spiritual Unfoldment

1932 births
1988 deaths
20th-century Hindu religious leaders
Indian Hindu missionaries
Spiritual teachers